Nicola Ottaviani (born 21 July 1968) is an Italian politician and lawyer.

He is member of the Lega Nord party. He was born in Frosinone, Italy. He has served as Mayor of Frosinone from 2012 to 2022.

References

External links
 
 

Living people
1968 births
People from Frosinone
Forza Italia politicians
Forza Italia (2013) politicians
The People of Freedom politicians
21st-century Italian politicians
20th-century Italian lawyers
Mayors of Frosinone
Libera Università Internazionale degli Studi Sociali Guido Carli alumni